Provița may refer to the following places in Romania:

Provița de Jos, a commune in Prahova County
Provița de Sus, a commune in Prahova County
Provița (river), a tributary of the Cricovul Dulce in Prahova and Dâmbovița Counties